Bob Cohn (born April 18, 1963) is an American journalist. He is the president of the Economist.

Early life
Cohn grew up in Chicago and graduated from Stanford University. He has a Masters in the Study of Law from Yale Law School, where he was a Ford Foundation Fellow.

Career
Bob Cohn is president of the Economist since January 2020. He served previously as President of The Atlantic and, before that, editor of TheAtlantic.com. He was also the executive editor of Wired and The Industry Standard, a Washington Correspondent for Newsweek, and the editor and publisher of Stanford Magazine.

As president, Cohn has led The Atlantic to record audiences, revenue, and profitability. He was responsible for The Atlantic'''s print, digital, live events, and consulting platforms. He was named to the job in 2014 after five years as editor of Atlantic Digital, where he built and managed teams at TheAtlantic.com, The Wire, and CityLab, and grew the audience ten-fold. He joined The Atlantic in January 2009.

Cohn began his journalism career at Newsweek, where he worked in the Washington, D.C. bureau for 10 years. He covered the Supreme Court and the Justice Department for three years during the presidency of George H. W. Bush, and the Clinton White House from 1993 to 1996. In 1996, he moved to California to be editor and publisher of Stanford Magazine. He then worked two years as executive editor of The Industry Standard in San Francisco, before taking a job as executive editor at Wired magazine, where he worked from 2001 to 2008. At Wired, Cohn helped the magazine find a mainstream following and earn national recognition, including three National Magazine Awards for General Excellence during his tenure.

Awards
In 2018, Cohn was named Publishing Executive of the Year by Adweek. He helped lead The Atlantic to National Magazine Awards for Magazine of the Year (2016)  and Best Website (2013). The Atlantic was named Publisher of the Year by Digiday in 2016, and to Advertising Age's Magazine A-List in that same year. TheAtlantic.com was a finalist for a National Magazine Award for General Excellence in 2010, 2011, and 2012. During his tenure at Wired, the magazine won three National Magazine Awards for General Excellence. In 1992 he won, with his colleague David Kaplan, the American Bar Association's Silver Gavel Award for coverage of the Supreme Court nomination process.

In 2009, Cohn was named a Huffington Post Game Changer in Media, along with Atlantic editor James Bennet.  Washingtonian'' selected Cohn as one of  its “Movers and Shakers Behind the Scenes," while "GQ" picked him as one of “50 Most Powerful People in Washington.”

References

External links

1963 births
Living people
American male journalists
Stanford University alumni
Yale Law School alumni
The Atlantic (magazine) people
Ford Foundation fellowships